Zangiabad Rural District is a rural district (dehestan) in the Central District of Kerman County, Kerman Province, Iran. At the 2006 census, its population was 11,438, in 2,660 families. The rural district has 32 villages.

References 

Rural Districts of Kerman Province
Kerman County